The 2017–18 Liga I (also known as Liga 1 Betano for sponsorship reasons) was the 100th season of the Liga I, the top professional league for Romanian association football clubs. The season began on 14 July 2017 and ended on 2 June 2018, being the third to take place since the play-off/play-out format has been introduced. 

Defending champions Viitorul Constanța came fourth. CFR Cluj became the new champions in the last fixture of the play-off, clinching their fourth league title after finishing one point above FCSB. Juventus București and Sepsi OSK entered as the promoted teams from the 2016–17 Liga II, but only the latter managed to avoid relegation.

Since Romania dropped from 15th to 17th in the UEFA association coefficient rankings, only the title winner qualified for the UEFA Champions League.

Teams
The league consists of 14 teams: twelve teams from the 2016–17 Liga I and two new teams from the 2016–17 Liga II. 

Teams promoted to the Liga I

The first club to be promoted was Juventus București, following their 3–1 win against Balotești on 30 April 2017. Juventus will play in the Liga I for the first time in their history.

The second club to be promoted was Sepsi OSK, following their 1–1 draw against Mioveni on 3 June 2017. Sepsi will play in the Liga I for the first time in their history.

Teams relegated to the Liga II

The first club to be relegated was Târgu Mureș, which were relegated on 19 May 2017 following a 0–1 defeat against Pandurii Târgu Jiu, ending their 3-year stay in the top flight.

The second and final club to be relegated was Pandurii Târgu Jiu, which were relegated on 4 June 2018 following their 1–2 defeat against Botoșani, ending their 12-year stay in the top flight.

Venues

Personnel and kits

Note: Flags indicate national team as has been defined under FIFA eligibility rules. Players and Managers may hold more than one non-FIFA nationality.

Managerial changes

Regular season
In the regular season the 14 teams will meet twice, a total of 26 matches per team, with the top 6 advancing to the Championship round and the bottom 8 qualifying for Relegation round.

Table

Results

Positions by round

Championship play-offs
The top six teams from Regular season would meet twice (10 matches per team) for places in 2018–19 UEFA Champions League and 2018–19 UEFA Europa League as well as deciding the league champion. Teams started the Championship round with their points from the Regular season halved, rounded upwards, and no other records carried over from the Regular season.

Table

Results

Positions by round

Relegation play-outs
The bottom eight teams from regular season will meet twice (14 matches per team) to contest against relegation. Teams start the Relegation round with their points from the Regular season halved, rounded upwards, and no other records carried over from the Regular season. The winner of the Relegation round finishes 7th in the overall season standings, the second placed team - 8th, and so on, with the last placed team in the Relegation round being 14th.

Table

Results

Positions by round

Promotion/relegation play-offs
The 12th-placed team of the Liga I faced the 3rd-placed team of the Liga II.

Notes:
 Voluntari remained in Liga I and Chindia Târgoviște remained in Liga II.

Season statistics

Top scorers
Updated to matches played on 2 June 2018.

Hat-tricks

4 Player scored four goals

Clean sheets
Updated to matches played on 2 June 2018.

1 Florin Niță was transferred to Sparta Prague during the winter transfer window.

Discipline
As of 2 June 2018

Player
Most yellow cards: 14
 István Fülöp (Sepsi OSK)
Most red cards: 2
 Anatole Abang (Astra Giurgiu)
 Ionuț Cioinac (CSM Politehnica Iași)
 Diogo Salomão (Dinamo București)
 Kévin Boli (CFR Cluj)
 Kamer Qaka (CSM Politehnica Iași)
 Mădălin Mihăescu (CSM Politehnica Iași)
 Mihai Pintilii (FCSB)
 Gabriel Cânu (ACS Poli Timișoara)
 Dragoș Balauru (Voluntari)

Club
Most yellow cards: 116
CSM Politehnica Iași
Most red cards: 9
Astra Giurgiu

Attendances

Champion squad

Awards

Best Team of the Championship play-offs

Monthly awards

References

External links
 

 

2017-18
2017–18 in Romanian football
ro